The Houston Astros' 1988 season was a season in American baseball. It involved the Houston Astros attempting to win the National League West.

Offseason
October 13, 1987: Ronn Reynolds was released by the Houston Astros.
December 8, 1987: Ed Whited was traded by the Houston Astros with Mike Stoker (minors) to the Atlanta Braves for Rafael Ramirez and cash. 
 January 8, 1988: Joaquín Andújar was signed as a free agent by the Astros.
 March 10, 1988: Ernie Camacho was signed as a free agent by the Astros.
 March 25, 1988: Robbie Wine was traded by the Astros to the Texas Rangers for Mike Loynd.

Regular season

Season standings

Record vs. opponents

Detailed records

Notable transactions
 July 23, 1988: Mark Bailey was traded by the Astros to the Montreal Expos for Casey Candaele.
 August 31, 1988: Denny Walling was traded by the Astros to the St. Louis Cardinals for Bob Forsch.

Draft picks
 June 1, 1988: 1988 Major League Baseball Draft
Dave Silvestri was drafted by the Astros in the 2nd round. Player signed October 18, 1988.
Kenny Lofton was drafted by the Astros in the 17th round. Lofton signed on June 16, 1988.

Miscellaneous
This roster of pitchers had 8 career no-hitters with 5 (at the time) by Nolan Ryan, 2 by Bob Forsch, and 1 by Mike Scott.

Roster

Game log

|-
|- style="background:#cfc;"
| 1 || April 5 || Padres || 6–3 || || || || 1–0
|- style="background:#cfc;"
| 2 || April 6 || Padres || 5–1 || || || || 2–0
|- style="background:#cfc;"
| 3 || April 8 || @ Reds || 8–3  || || || || 3–0
|- style="background:#fbb;"
| 4 || April 9 || @ Reds || 4–5 || || || || 3–1
|- style="background:#cfc;"
| 5 || April 10 || @ Reds || 12–3 || || || || 4–1
|- style="background:#cfc;"
| 6 || April 12 || @ Braves || 8–3 || || || || 5–1
|- style="background:#cfc;"
| 7 || April 13 || @ Braves || 4–0 || || || || 6–1
|- style="background:#cfc;"
| 8 || April 14 || Reds || 9–3 || || || || 7–1
|- style="background:#fbb;"
| 9 || April 15 || Reds || 2–4  || || || || 7–2
|- style="background:#fbb;"
| 10 || April 16 || Reds || 2–8 || || || || 7–3
|- style="background:#cfc;"
| 11 || April 17 || Reds || 5–3 || || || || 8–3
|- style="background:#fbb;"
| 12 || April 19 || Braves || 4–5 || || || || 8–4
|- style="background:#cfc;"
| 13 || April 20 || Braves || 1–0 || || || || 9–4
|- style="background:#cfc;"
| 14 || April 21 || Braves || 8–0 || || || || 10–4
|- style="background:#fbb;"
| 15 || April 22 || @ Padres || 1–3 || || || || 10–5
|- style="background:#fbb;"
| 16 || April 23 || @ Padres || 0–4 || || || || 10–6
|- style="background:#fbb;"
| 17 || April 24 || @ Padres || 0–3 || || || || 10–7
|- style="background:#cfc;"
| 18 || April 26 || Phillies || 3–1 || || || || 11–7
|- style="background:#cfc;"
| 19 || April 27 || Phillies || 3–2  || || || || 12–7
|- style="background:#cfc;"
| 20 || April 29 || Expos || 6–4 || || || || 13–7
|- style="background:#cfc;"
| 21 || April 30 || Expos || 3–0 || || || || 14–7

|-
|- style="background:#fbb;"
| 22 || May 1 || Expos || 3–7  || || || || 14–8
|- style="background:#fbb;"
| 23 || May 2 || @ Phillies || 1–7 || || || || 14–9
|- style="background:#cfc;"
| 24 || May 3 || @ Phillies || 4–0 || || || || 15–9
|- style="background:#fbb;"
| 25 || May 4 || @ Mets || 0–8 || || || || 15–10
|- style="background:#bbb;"
|—|| May 5 || @ Mets || colspan=7 | Postponed (rain); Makeup: July 1
|- style="background:#fbb;"
| 26 || May 6 || @ Expos || 5–6  || || || || 15–11
|- style="background:#fbb;"
| 27 || May 7 || @ Expos || 3–4 || || || || 15–12
|- style="background:#cfc;"
| 28 || May 8 || @ Expos || 7–2 || || || || 16–12
|- style="background:#cfc;"
| 29 || May 9 || Mets || 6–2 || || || || 17–12
|- style="background:#fbb;"
| 30 || May 10 || Mets || 2–5 || || || || 17–13
|- style="background:#fbb;"
| 31 || May 11 || Mets || 8–9  || || || || 17–14
|- style="background:#cfc;"
| 32 || May 13 || Cubs || 8–2 || || || || 18–14
|- style="background:#cfc;"
| 33 || May 14 || Cubs || 3–1 || || || || 19–14
|- style="background:#fbb;"
| 34 || May 15 || Cubs || 1–2 || || || || 19–15
|- style="background:#cfc;"
| 35 || May 16 || Pirates || 9–2 || || || || 20–15
|- style="background:#cfc;"
| 36 || May 17 || Pirates || 3–2 || || || || 21–15
|- style="background:#cfc;"
| 37 || May 18 || Pirates || 4–2 || || || || 22–15
|- style="background:#cfc;"
| 38 || May 20 || @ Cardinals || 5–3 || || || || 23–15
|- style="background:#fbb;"
| 39 || May 21 || @ Cardinals || 4–7  || || || || 23–16
|- style="background:#cfc;"
| 40 || May 22 || @ Cardinals || 2–1 || || || || 24–16
|- style="background:#cfc;"
| 41 || May 23 || @ Pirates || 3–0 || || || || 25–16
|- style="background:#fbb;"
| 42 || May 24 || @ Pirates || 4–5 || || || || 25–17
|- style="background:#fbb;"
| 43 || May 25 || @ Pirates || 3–4 || || || || 25–18
|- style="background:#fbb;"
| 44 || May 27 || @ Cubs || 2–3 || || || || 25–19
|- style="background:#fbb;"
| 45 || May 28 || @ Cubs || 7–14 || || || || 25–20
|- style="background:#cfc;"
| 46 || May 29 || @ Cubs || 7–1 || || || || 26–20
|- style="background:#cfc;"
| 47 || May 30 || Cardinals || 5–4 || || || || 27–20
|- style="background:#fbb;"
| 48 || May 31 || Cardinals || 7–9 || || || || 27–21

|-
|- style="background:#fbb;"
| 49 || June 1 || Cardinals || 2–3  || || || || 27–22
|- style="background:#cfc;"
| 50 || June 3 || @ Giants || 8–4 || || || || 28–22
|- style="background:#fbb;"
| 51 || June 4 || @ Giants || 2–8 || || || || 28–23
|- style="background:#fbb;"
| 52 || June 5 || @ Giants || 3–9 || || || || 28–24
|- style="background:#cfc;"
| 53 || June 6 || @ Dodgers || 10–4 || || || || 29–24
|- style="background:#cfc;"
| 54 || June 7 || @ Dodgers || 5–2 || || || || 30–24
|- style="background:#fbb;"
| 55 || June 8 || @ Dodgers || 1–11 || || || || 30–25
|- style="background:#fbb;"
| 56 || June 9 || @ Dodgers || 2–4 || || || || 30–26
|- style="background:#fbb;"
| 57 || June 10 || Braves || 3–10  || || || || 30–27
|- style="background:#cfc;"
| 58 || June 11 || Braves || 5–4  || || || || 31–27
|- style="background:#cfc;"
| 59 || June 12 || Braves || 5–0 || || || || 32–27
|- style="background:#cfc;"
| 60 || June 13 || Braves || 6–5 || || || || 33–27
|- style="background:#fbb;"
| 61 || June 14 || @ Reds || 1–7 || || || || 33–28
|- style="background:#fbb;"
| 62 || June 15 || @ Reds || 3–5 || || || || 33–29
|- style="background:#cfc;"
| 63 || June 16 || @ Reds || 7–4 || || || || 34–29
|- style="background:#fbb;"
| 64 || June 17 || @ Braves || 3–4 || || || || 34–30
|- style="background:#fbb;"
| 65 || June 17 || @ Braves || 5–6 || || || || 34–31
|- style="background:#cfc;"
| 66 || June 18 || @ Braves || 14–7 || || || || 35–31
|- style="background:#cfc;"
| 67 || June 19 || @ Braves || 6–4 || || || || 36–31
|- style="background:#fbb;"
| 68 || June 20 || Reds || 1–2 || || || || 36–32
|- style="background:#cfc;"
| 69 || June 21 || Reds || 3–1 || || || || 37–32
|- style="background:#cfc;"
| 70 || June 22 || Reds || 5–1 || || || || 38–32
|- style="background:#fbb;"
| 71 || June 24 || Giants || 0–11 || || || || 38–33
|- style="background:#fbb;"
| 72 || June 25 || Giants || 1–4 || || || || 38–34
|- style="background:#cfc;"
| 73 || June 26 || Giants || 6–0 || || || || 39–34
|- style="background:#fbb;"
| 74 || June 27 || Dodgers || 0–4 || || || || 39–35
|- style="background:#cfc;"
| 75 || June 28 || Dodgers || 4–3 || || || || 40–35
|- style="background:#fbb;"
| 76 || June 29 || Dodgers || 0–2 || || || || 40–36
|- style="background:#fbb;"
| 77 || June 30 || @ Mets || 6–12 || || || || 40–37

|-
|- style="background:#fbb;"
| 78 || July 1 || @ Mets || 2–3 || || || || 40–38
|- style="background:#cfc;"
| 79 || July 1 || @ Mets || 6–5  || || || || 41–38
|- style="background:#fbb;"
| 80 || July 2 || @ Mets || 2–7 || || || || 41–39
|- style="background:#fbb;"
| 81 || July 3 || @ Mets || 0–5 || || || || 41–40
|- style="background:#fbb;"
| 82 || July 4 || Expos || 4–7 || || || || 41–41
|- style="background:#fbb;"
| 83 || July 5 || Expos || 3–4  || || || || 41–42
|- style="background:#fbb;"
| 84 || July 6 || Expos || 2–4 || || || || 41–43
|- style="background:#cfc;"
| 85 || July 8 || Mets || 4–2 || || || || 42–43
|- style="background:#cfc;"
| 86 || July 9 || Mets || 6–3 || || || || 43–43
|- style="background:#cfc;"
| 87 || July 10 || Mets || 6–5 || || || || 44–43
|- style="background:#cfc;"
| 88 || July 14 || @ Phillies || 7–5 || || || || 45–43
|- style="background:#cfc;"
| 89 || July 15 || @ Phillies || 5–2 || || || || 46–43
|- style="background:#fbb;"
| 90 || July 16 || @ Phillies || 6–10 || || || || 46–44
|- style="background:#fbb;"
| 91 || July 17 || @ Phillies || 4–10 || || || || 46–45
|- style="background:#cfc;"
| 92 || July 18 || @ Expos || 6–1 || || || || 47–45
|- style="background:#cfc;"
| 93 || July 19 || @ Expos || 4–3 || || || || 48–45
|- style="background:#cfc;"
| 94 || July 20 || @ Expos || 3–2 || || || || 49–45
|- style="background:#cfc;"
| 95 || July 21 || Phillies || 2–0 || || || || 50–45
|- style="background:#cfc;"
| 96 || July 22 || Phillies || 5–3 || || || || 51–45
|- style="background:#cfc;"
| 97 || July 23 || Phillies || 7–6 || || || || 52–45
|- style="background:#fbb;"
| 98 || July 24 || Phillies || 4–6 || || || || 52–46
|- style="background:#fbb;"
| 99 || July 26 || @ Padres || 1–5 || || || || 52–47
|- style="background:#cfc;"
| 100 || July 27 || @ Padres || 4–1 || || || || 53–47
|- style="background:#cfc;"
| 101 || July 28 || @ Padres || 3–2 || || || || 54–47
|- style="background:#cfc;"
| 102 || July 29 || @ Dodgers || 3–1 || || || || 55–47
|- style="background:#cfc;"
| 103 || July 30 || @ Dodgers || 14–6 || || || || 56–47
|- style="background:#fbb;"
| 104 || July 31 || @ Dodgers || 1–6 || || || || 56–48

|-
|- style="background:#fbb;"
| 105 || August 1 || @ Giants || 1–4 || || || || 56–49
|- style="background:#cfc;"
| 106 || August 2 || @ Giants || 13–10 || || || || 57–49
|- style="background:#cfc;"
| 107 || August 3 || @ Giants || 3–2 || || || || 58–49
|- style="background:#cfc;"
| 108 || August 5 || Dodgers || 6–4 || || || || 59–49
|- style="background:#fbb;"
| 109 || August 6 || Dodgers || 3–5 || || || || 59–50
|- style="background:#cfc;"
| 110 || August 7 || Dodgers || 4–2 || || || || 60–50
|- style="background:#cfc;"
| 111 || August 8 || Dodgers || 10–0 || || || || 61–50
|- style="background:#cfc;"
| 112 || August 9 || Giants || 3–2 || || || || 62–50
|- style="background:#fbb;"
| 113 || August 10 || Giants || 0–5 || || || || 62–51
|- style="background:#fbb;"
| 114 || August 11 || Giants || 0–6 || || || || 62–52
|- style="background:#fbb;"
| 115 || August 12 || Padres || 3–4 || || || || 62–53
|- style="background:#cfc;"
| 116 || August 13 || Padres || 1–0 || || || || 63–53
|- style="background:#fbb;"
| 117 || August 14 || Padres || 1–6 || || || || 63–54
|- style="background:#cfc;"
| 118 || August 15 || Padres || 7–3 || || || || 64–54
|- style="background:#fbb;"
| 119 || August 16 || @ Cardinals || 0–3 || || || || 64–55
|- style="background:#cfc;"
| 120 || August 17 || @ Cardinals || 1–0 || || || || 65–55
|- style="background:#fbb;"
| 121 || August 18 || @ Cardinals || 1–2 || || || || 65–56
|- style="background:#cfc;"
| 122 || August 19 || @ Pirates || 5–1 || || || || 66–56
|- style="background:#fbb;"
| 123 || August 20 || @ Pirates || 1–2 || || || || 66–57
|- style="background:#cfc;"
| 124 || August 21 || @ Pirates || 2–1  || || || || 67–57
|- style="background:#cfc;"
| 125 || August 22 || @ Cubs || 9–7  || || || || 68–57
|- style="background:#fbb;"
| 126 || August 23 || @ Cubs || 3–9 || || || || 68–58
|- style="background:#fbb;"
| 127 || August 24 || @ Cubs || 2–3 || || || || 68–59
|- style="background:#cfc;"
| 128 || August 26 || Pirates || 2–0 || || || || 69–59
|- style="background:#cfc;"
| 129 || August 27 || Pirates || 3–1 || || || || 70–59
|- style="background:#fbb;"
| 130 || August 28 || Pirates || 3–4 || || || || 70–60
|- style="background:#fbb;"
| 131 || August 29 || Cubs || 1–2  || || || || 70–61
|- style="background:#cfc;"
| 132 || August 30 || Cubs || 7–4 || || || || 71–61
|- style="background:#fbb;"
| 133 || August 31 || Cubs || 1–3 || || || || 71–62

|-
|- style="background:#fbb;"
| 134 || September 2 || Cardinals || 0–2 || || || || 71–63
|- style="background:#cfc;"
| 135 || September 3 || Cardinals || 10–1 || || || || 72–63
|- style="background:#cfc;"
| 136 || September 4 || Cardinals || 4–3 || || || || 73–63
|- style="background:#cfc;"
| 137 || September 5 || Reds || 3–0 || || || || 74–63
|- style="background:#fbb;"
| 138 || September 6 || Reds || 3–10 || || || || 74–64
|- style="background:#fbb;"
| 139 || September 7 || @ Dodgers || 1–4 || || || || 74–65
|- style="background:#cfc;"
| 140 || September 8 || @ Dodgers || 2–1 || || || || 75–65
|- style="background:#cfc;"
| 141 || September 9 || @ Giants || 4–3  || || || || 76–65
|- style="background:#fbb;"
| 142 || September 10 || @ Giants || 2–3 || || || || 76–66
|- style="background:#cfc;"
| 143 || September 11 || @ Giants || 4–1 || || || || 77–66
|- style="background:#fbb;"
| 144 || September 13 || @ Reds || 2–5 || || || || 77–67
|- style="background:#cfc;"
| 145 || September 14 || @ Reds || 7–1 || || || || 78–67
|- style="background:#fbb;"
| 146 || September 15 || @ Reds || 5–7 || || || || 78–68
|- style="background:#fbb;"
| 147 || September 16 || Giants || 4–5 || || || || 78–69
|- style="background:#fbb;"
| 148 || September 17 || Giants || 2–4 || || || || 78–70
|- style="background:#fbb;"
| 149 || September 18 || Giants || 3–10 || || || || 78–71
|- style="background:#fbb;"
| 150 || September 19 || Dodgers || 0–1 || || || || 78–72
|- style="background:#fbb;"
| 151 || September 20 || Dodgers || 0–6 || || || || 78–73
|- style="background:#cfc;"
| 152 || September 21 || Braves || 1–0 || || || || 79–73
|- style="background:#cfc;"
| 153 || September 22 || Braves || 3–2 || || || || 80–73
|- style="background:#fbb;"
| 154 || September 23 || @ Padres || 3–4  || || || || 80–74
|- style="background:#fbb;"
| 155 || September 24 || @ Padres || 0–3 || || || || 80–75
|- style="background:#fbb;"
| 156 || September 25 || @ Padres || 1–9 || || || || 80–76
|- style="background:#cfc;"
| 157 || September 27 || @ Braves || 3–2  || || || || 81–76
|- style="background:#fbb;"
| 158 || September 28 || @ Braves || 3–4  || || || || 81–77
|- style="background:#cfc;"
| 159 || September 29 || @ Braves || 5–4 || || || || 82–77
|- style="background:#fbb;"
| 160 || September 30 || Padres || 1–5 || || || || 82–78

|-
|- style="background:#fbb;"
| 161 || October 1 || Padres || 3–6 || || || || 82–79
|- style="background:#fbb;"
| 162 || October 2 || Padres || 1–5 || || || || 82–80

|- style="text-align:center;"
| Legend:       = Win       = Loss       = PostponementBold = Astros team member

Player stats

Batting

Starters by position
Note: Pos = Position; G = Games played; AB = At bats; H = Hits; Avg. = Batting average; HR = Home runs; RBI = Runs batted in

Other batters
Note: G = Games played; AB = At bats; H = Hits; Avg. = Batting average; HR = Home runs; RBI = Runs batted in

Pitching

Starting pitchers
Note: G = Games pitched; IP = Innings pitched; W = Wins; L = Losses; ERA = Earned run average; SO = Strikeouts

Other pitchers
Note: G = Games pitched; IP = Innings pitched; W = Wins; L = Losses; ERA = Earned run average; SO = Strikeouts

Relief pitchers
Note: G = Games pitched; W = Wins; L = Losses; SV = Saves; ERA = Earned run average; SO = Strikeouts

Farm system

References

External links
1988 Houston Astros season at Baseball Reference

Houston Astros seasons
Houston Astros season
Houston Astros
1988 in Houston